The commanders-in-chief of the United Confederate Veterans from June 10, 1889, to December 31, 1951:

The Commanders-in-Chief of the United Confederate Veterans (UCV)
 John B. Gordon 1889-1904
 Stephen D. Lee 1904-1908
 William L. Cabell 1908-1909
 Clement A. Evans 1909-1910
 George W. Gordon 1910-1911
 Cornelius I. Walker 1911-1912
 Bennett H. Young 1912-1916
 George P. Harrison 1916-1919
 Khleber Miller Van Zandt 1919-1921
 Julian S. Carr 1921-1923
 William B. Halderman 1923-1924
 James A. Thomas 1924-1925
 Walker B. Freeman 1925-1926
 Morris D. Vance 1926-1927
 James C. Foster 1927-1928
 Albert T. Goodwyn 1928-1929
 Richard A. Sneed 1929-1930
 Len W. Stephens 1930-1931
 Charles A. DeSaussure 1931-1932
 Homer T. Atkinson 1932-1934
 Rice A. Pierce 1934-1935
 Harry R. Lee 1935-1936
 Homer T. Atkinson 1936-1937
 John M. Claypool 1937-1938
 John W. Harris 1938-1939
 Julius F. Howell 1939-1941
 John M. Claypool 1941-1942
 John W. Harris 1942-1943
 Homer T. Atkinson 1943-1945
 William Banks 1945-1946
 Henry T. Dowling 1946-1947
 James W. Moore 1947-1948
 William. M. Buck 1948-1949
 James W. Moore 1949-1951

Gallery

References 
 
 
 
 
 
 
 

Lists of American people
Lists of people by activity
Commanders